Achille Funi (26 February 1890 – 26 July 1972) was an Italian painter who painted in a Modernist take on the neoclassical style.

Biography
Funi was born in Ferrara. He studied at the Brera Academy of Fine Arts from 1906 to 1910 and joined the Nuove Tendenze movement as a painter of Cubo-Futurist works in 1914. Having enlisted in the Volunteer Cyclist Battalion and served in World War I, he became a champion of the "return to order". He studied Graeco-Roman statuary and was influenced by De Chirico's Metaphysical painting. His Autoritratto da giovane ("Self-portrait as a Young Man"; 1924) is in the Museo Cantonale d’Arte in Lugano.

In 1920, Funi met the journalist and art patron Margherita Sarfatti, who took an interest in him as one of a group of artists whose work she believed represented modern Italy. He participated in an exhibition Marfatti presented in 1923 entitled Sette Pittori del Novecento (Seven Painters of the Twentieth Century), which included Funi, Anselmo Bucci, Leonardo Dudreville, Gian Emilio Malerba, Piero Marussig, Ubaldo Oppi, and Mario Sironi. Funi became one of the leaders of Novecento Italiano, taking part in the movement's first and second exhibitions (Milan, 1926 and 1929). The author of numerous frescoes in the 1930s, he was a signatory of the Manifesto della Pittura Murale together with Mario Sironi in 1933 and became one of the artists most esteemed by the Fascist regime, obtaining a teaching post at the Brera Academy in 1939. The period after World War II saw the continuation of decorative works for public and religious buildings in Milan and a parallel focus on landscapes. He died in Appiano Gentile on 26 July 1972.

Works
Portrait of his sister Margaret, 1913
Window, 1915
Self-Portrait, 1920
Earth, 1921
Maternity, 1921
Self-portrait as a young man, 1924
The myth of Ferrara, dining dell'Arengo Municipal Palace of Ferrara, 1934–1937.

Public collections
Gallery Guggenheim in Venice
Museum of Modern and Contemporary Art Filippo de Pisis Ferrara
Pinacoteca Leonidas and Albertina Repaci Palmi

Notes

References
 Cowling, Elizabeth; Mundy, Jennifer (1990). On Classic Ground: Picasso, Léger, de Chirico and the New Classicism 1910-1930. London: Tate Gallery. 
 Crippa, Antonella. Achille Funi, online catalogue Artgate by Fondazione Cariplo, 2010, CC BY-SA 
 Metken, Günter (1981). Realismus: zwischen Revolution und Reaktion, 1919-1939. München: Prestel-Verlag.

Further reading
Nicoletta Colombo (eds), Achille Funi, Catalogue of paintings and cartoons in 2 tomes, Milan, Leonardo Art, 1996
Antonella Crippa, Achille Funi, catalog Artgate Fondazione Cariplo, 2010, CC-BY-SA.

Other projects

20th-century Italian painters
20th-century Italian male artists
Italian male painters
1890 births
1972 deaths
Painters from Ferrara
Italian military personnel of World War I
Academic staff of Brera Academy
Brera Academy alumni